Major-General Sir James Arthur "Jack" d'Avigdor-Goldsmid, 3rd Baronet,  (19 December 1912 – 6 September 1987) was a British Army officer and British Conservative politician. He was a member of the prominent Anglo-Jewish d'Avigdor-Goldsmid family, and his brother Sir Henry d'Avigdor-Goldsmid, 2nd Baronet was also a Member of Parliament.

Early life
D'Avigdor-Goldsmid was born on 19 December 1912 and was the younger son of Sir Osmond d'Avigdor-Goldsmid, 1st Baronet. He was educated at Harrow School.

Military career
Having attended the Royal Military College, Sandhurst, d'Avigdor-Goldsmid was commissioned into the 4th/7th Royal Dragoon Guards on 1 September 1932 as a second lieutenant. He was promoted to lieutenant on 1 September 1935. He was appointed adjutant on 14 October 1937. He was promoted to captain on 1 September 1940. As a captain (temporary major) he participated in the D-Day landings of the Second World War.

He was promoted to major on 1 July 1946, lieutenant colonel on 31 December 1951, and to colonel on 19 January 1956. He was given command of 20th Armoured Brigade in 1958. He was promoted to brigadier on 1 January 1961. He was appointed Deputy Commander of Aldershot Command from September 1961 to 1962. On 31 October 1962, he was granted the temporary rank of major-general and appointed Director of the Royal Armoured Corps. His promotion to major-general was confirmed on 1 January 1963 and back dated to 31 October 1962 with seniority from 6 April 1962. He relinquished the appointment of Director of the Royal Armoured Corps on 27 January 1965.

On 28 February 1965, he was appointed President of the Regular Commissions Board, relinquishing the position on 20 September 1965. On 1 February 1966, he was posted to the Ministry of Defence as Director of Territorial Army and Cadets. He relinquished the post on 20 January 1968, the day he retired from the military.

Later life and political career
In 1968, D'Avigdor-Goldsmid joined the Jockey Club and acted as Steward at several horse race meetings.

In the 1970 general election, he was elected as the Member of Parliament for Lichfield and Tamworth. He held the seat in the February 1974 general election. He lost his seat in the October 1974 general election to Labour's Bruce Grocott.

He inherited the d'Avigdor-Goldsmid Baronetcy on 11 December 1976 upon the death of Henry d'Avigdor-Goldsmid, his elder brother.

Honours and decorations
On 31 August 1944, then Captain (temporary Major) d'Avigdor-Goldsmid was awarded the Military Cross (MC) "in recognition of gallant and distinguished services in Normandy". In the 1965 Queen's Birthday Honours, he was appointed Companion of the Order of the Bath (CB).

He was appointed to the honorary position of Colonel of the 4th/7th Royal Dragoon Guards on 6 June 1963.

References 

Times Guide to the House of Commons February 1974

External links 
British Army Officers 1939−1945

1912 births
1987 deaths
4th/7th Royal Dragoon Guards officers
British Army major generals
British Army personnel of World War II
British Jews
Conservative Party (UK) MPs for English constituencies
People educated at Harrow School
UK MPs 1970–1974
UK MPs 1974
Graduates of the Royal Military College, Sandhurst
Baronets in the Baronetage of the United Kingdom
Companions of the Order of the Bath
Officers of the Order of the British Empire
Recipients of the Military Cross
British people of Dutch-Jewish descent
Jewish British politicians
Jack